Lady Katherine Percy (18 May 1423 – ) was the daughter of Henry Percy, 2nd Earl of Northumberland, and Lady Eleanor Neville.

Her maternal grandparents were Ralph Neville, 1st Earl of Westmorland and his second wife Joan Beaufort, a legitimized daughter of John of Gaunt.

She married Edmund Grey, 1st Earl of Kent, and had seven children:

 Mary Grey (1440–1474);
 Anthony Grey (1446–1480), married Eleanor Woodville, daughter of Richard Woodville, 1st Earl Rivers;
 Elizabeth Grey (d. 1472), married Sir Robert Greystoke;
 Anne Grey (b. 1450), married John Grey, 8th Baron Grey de Wilton;
 George Grey, 2nd Earl of Kent (1454–1505), married Anne Woodville;
 John Grey (1455–1484);
 Edmund Grey (b. 1457).

Ancestry

External links
Profile, Tudorplace.com. Accessed 7 January 2023.

1423 births
1470s deaths
Kent
15th-century English people 
15th-century English women
Daughters of British earls
Katherine Percy, Lady
Wives of knights